Alieu Fadera (born 3 November 2001) is a Gambian professional footballer who plays as a winger for Belgian First Division A club Zulte Waregem.

Club career

Pohronie
Fadera's arrival in Slovak Fortuna Liga club FK Pohronie was announced on the club's website on 6 March 2020. His debut was delayed due to league postponement, caused by the coronavirus pandemic. 

He became Pohronie's top scorer in 2020–21 season, tied with James Weir with 5 goals each.

Zulte Waregem
On 3 August 2021, it was announced that Fadera had signed a four-year contract with Zulte Waregem. He was praised for his athleticism and physicality, as well as versatility in the offence.

International career
In March 2021, Fadera received a nomination to the Gambian national team for two African Cup of Nations qualifiers against Angola and DR Congo. In line with FIFA regulations, Pohronie decided not to release Fadera for international fixtures due to concerns over COVID-19 pandemic and subsequent quarantine requirements those would rule Fadera out of important relegation group fixtures.

Personal life
Per his social media communication, Fadera adheres to Islam. Born in Fajara, The Gambia.

Honours

International
Gambia
WAFU U20 Championship: 2019

References

External links
 FK Pohronie official club profile
 Futbalnet profile

2001 births
Living people
People from Bakau
Gambian Muslims
Gambian footballers
The Gambia under-20 international footballers
Gambian expatriate footballers
Association football midfielders
Real de Banjul FC players
GFA League First Division players
FK Pohronie players
S.V. Zulte Waregem players
Slovak Super Liga players
Belgian Pro League players
Gambian expatriate sportspeople in Slovakia
Expatriate footballers in Slovakia
Gambian expatriate sportspeople in Belgium
Expatriate footballers in Belgium